Meramec Valley Christian School is a small, private Christian school in Bourbon, Missouri.  Founded in 1996, MVCS offers Kindergarten through 12th grade education. The school is a ministry of Meramec Valley Baptist Church and is a member of the Missouri Association of Christian Schools, a state chapter of the American Association of Christian Schools.

References

External links
Mereamec Valley Christian School

Baptist schools in the United States
Christian schools in Missouri
Educational institutions established in 1996
Private schools in Franklin County, Missouri
Private high schools in Missouri
Private middle schools in Missouri
Private elementary schools in Missouri
1996 establishments in Missouri